Donald Parry (birth unknown) is a former professional rugby league footballer who played in the 1980s.

International honours
Don Parry won caps for Wales while at Blackpool Borough in 1980 against France, and England, in 1981 against France, and England (2 matches), and in 1982 against Australia.

References

Blackpool Borough players
Living people
Rugby league hookers
Wales national rugby league team players
Year of birth missing (living people)